The 14th Pan American Games were held in Santo Domingo, Dominican Republic from August 1 to August 17, 2003.

Medalists 
The following competitors from Uruguay won medals at the games. In the by discipline sections below, medalists' names are bolded.

Bronze

Men's C-1 1000 m: Darwin Correa

Women's Team Competition: Uruguay women's national handball team
Mercedes Amor, Silvana de Armas, Jussara Castro, Verónica Castro, Lorena Estefanell, Mariana Fleitas, N'Haloy Laicouschi, Victoria Graña, Sofía Griot, Florencia Polcaro, Ivanna Scavino, Marcela Schelotto, Cecilia Schwedt, María Inés Terragno, and María Noel Uriarte

Results by event

Athletics
Mónica Falcioni
Déborah Gyurcsek
Heber Viera

Basketball

Men's team competition
Team roster
Mauricio Aguiar
Esteban Batista
Leandro García
Sebastián Leguizamón
Nicolás Mazzaino
Alejandro Muro
Trelonnie Owens
Gastón Paez
Alejandro Pérez
Luis Silveira
Gustavo Szczgielsky
Emiliano Taboada
Head coach: Néstor García

Bowling
Roberto Barañano
Luis Alberto Benasús

Canoeing
Darwin Correa
Marcelo d'Ambrosio

Cycling
Tomás Margalef
Luis Martínez
Milton Wynants

Fencing
Diego Silvera

Gymnastics
Carmen Laurino

Handball

Men's team competition
Juan Faustino Correa
Javier Fradiletti
Gonzalo Gamba
Maximiliano Gratadoux
Nicolás Laurino
Nicolás Orlando
Carlos Pintos
Pablo Poggio
Juan Pablo Queirolo
Manuel Ríos
Mario Sánchez
Christian Van Rompaey
Juan Andrés Venturini
Diego Viacava
Hernann Wenzel

Women's Team Competition
Mercedes Amor
Silvana de Armas
Jussara Castro
Verónica Castro
Lorena Estefanell
Mariana Fleitas
N'Haloy Laicouschi
Victoria Graña
Sofía Griot
Florencia Polcaro
Ivanna Scavino
Marcela Schelotto
Cecilia Schwedt
María Inés Terragno
María Noel Uriarte

Hockey

Women's Team Competition
María Inés Arigón
Anna Karina Bissignano
Adriana Boullosa
María Bouzas
Patricia Bueno
Patricia Carluccio
Virginia Casabó
María Bettiana Ceretta
María Eugenia Chiara
Andrea Fazzio
Ana Inés Hernández
María Carla Margni
Lorena Margni
Carolina Mutilva
María Noel Pérez
Mariana Ríos

Judo
Alvaro Pasaeyro
Milton Terra

Rowing
Rodolfo Collazo
Oscar Medina
Leandro Salvagno
Rúben Scarpatti

Sailing
Miguel Aguerre
Andrés Isola
Nicolás Shabán
Santiago Silveira

Shooting
Carolina Lozado

Swimming

Men's Competition

Serrana Fernández

Taekwondo
Mayko Votta

Tennis
Marcel Félder
Lucía Migliarini

Triathlon

Weightlifting
Edward Silva

Volleyball
Alejandra Porteiro and Fernanda Herrera
Guillermo Williman and Gerardo Peralta

See also
 Sport in Uruguay
 Uruguay at the 2004 Summer Olympics

References
Uruguay Olympic Committee

Nations at the 2003 Pan American Games
P
2003